Pyeongnaehopyeong Station is a railway station of the Gyeongchun Line in Pyeongnae-dong, Namyangju-si, Gyeonggi-do, South Korea.

Station Layout

External links

Railway stations in Gyeonggi Province
Seoul Metropolitan Subway stations
Metro stations in Namyangju
Railway stations opened in 1939